Anita Garibaldi (1821–1849) was a Brazilian republican revolutionary and the wife of Italian revolutionary Giuseppe Garibaldi

Anita Garibaldi may also refer to:

Anita Garibaldi (miniseries), a 2012 Italian television miniseries
Anita Garibaldi, Santa Catarina, a municipality in the state of Santa Catarina, Brazil
Anita e Garibaldi, a 2013 Brazilian film directed by Alberto Rondalli
Red Shirts (film), also known as Anita Garibaldi, a 1952 French-Italian film